Stepp Branch is a  long 1st order tributary to the Swannanoa River in Buncombe County, North Carolina.

Course
Stepp Branch rises about 1.5 miles south of Grovestone, North Carolina in Buncombe County at the base of Jesses High Top.  Stepp Branch then flows northwest to meet the Swannanoa River at Grovestone.

Watershed
Stepp Branch drains  of area, receives about 48.0 in/year of precipitation, has a topographic wetness index of 285.56 and is about 71% forested.

References

Rivers of North Carolina
Bodies of water of Buncombe County, North Carolina